Pudong International Information Port is a steel skyscraper in the Lujiazui financial district of Shanghai, China. It stands at 211 metres tall with 41 floors above ground and 4 floors of basement. The high-rise covers a total surface area of 103,442 m2. The commercial smart building was finished in 2001. Currently, it is used for office, communication, conference, parking garage and dining purposes.

See also
 List of tallest buildings in Shanghai

References

External links
 
 

Office buildings completed in 2001
Skyscraper office buildings in Shanghai